B. cylindrica may refer to:

Babella cylindrica, a sea snail species
Bicosoeca cylindrica, a species of bicosoecids in genus Bicosoeca
Boehmeria cylindrica, a flowering plant species
Brephulopsis cylindrica, a land snail species
Bruguiera cylindrica, a mangrove species
Bythinella cylindrica, a snail species